Florian 'Bichi' Bichler (born July 18, 1991) is a German footballer who plays for TSV Steinbach Haiger. 

Though two-footed, he is predominantly a left-sided midfielder. He is 172 cm (5 feet  inches) tall and weighs 70 kg (154 lbs). His nickname is Bichi.

Career
He made his debut for SpVgg Unterhaching in April 2013, as a substitute for Dominik Rohracker in a 1–0 defeat to Rot-Weiss Erfurt in the 3. Liga.

He joined SpVgg Unterhaching for a fee of €75,000 from SpVgg Greuther Fürth II on 1 January 2013. Prior to that, he played for TSV 1860 Rosenheim.

References

External links

1991 births
Living people
German footballers
3. Liga players
Regionalliga players
SpVgg Greuther Fürth players
SpVgg Unterhaching players
SpVgg Unterhaching II players
TSV 1860 Rosenheim players
FC Rot-Weiß Erfurt players
SV Elversberg players
TSV Steinbach Haiger players
Association football midfielders